Joseph Coyne Gambles (born 16 January 1982) is an Australian professional triathlete from Launceston, Tasmania who races in long distance, non-drafting triathlon events. In 2011 he placed second at the ITU Long Distance Triathlon World Championships and in 2013 he finished third at the Ironman 70.3 World Championship.

Career
Gambles was born in Burton upon Trent, Staffordshire, England and moved with his family to Australia at age three. Athletically, he began running at five or six years old in local clubs. He competed in his first triathlon at 13, and won, before taking triathlon seriously at age 15 once he joined the Australian junior development program. He raced as a professional for the first time at 16 as a "wildcard" before competing as an elite age group athlete for two seasons winning each race he entered. This success culminated in the 2000 World Championships when Joe took second in the 16- to 19-year-old category. These results led to Gambles being named the Australian Junior Triathlete of the year. From 2001 to 2004 Gambles focused on obtaining his Bachelor of Commerce at university while still competing in events in Australia, including the Triathlon Australia Accenture Series. After graduating he became a full-time athlete.

Gambles would transition from draft legal to non-drafting races, a style of racing that better suited him, particularly half-iron and iron-distances. Among his other successes he has won Ironman 70.3 Boulder for five time (2011 - 2014, 2016), a win in his Ironman debut at Wisconsin in 2010, a 2008 victory at the European Long Distance Triathlon Championships as a competitor for Great Britain, and a course record holder for 10 different half-iron distance courses.

Notable results
Gambles' notable race results include:

References

External links

1982 births
Living people
Australian male triathletes
English emigrants to Australia
Sportspeople from Launceston, Tasmania
Sportspeople from Burton upon Trent
20th-century Australian people
21st-century Australian people